Jeremy Schwartz is an English businessman. He was also the CEO of The Body Shop and Pandora.

Business career 
Schwartz began his career as a strategy consultant at Boston Consulting Group in 1987

In 1993, he joined L’Oréal, becoming overall marketing director in 1995.

From 2002 to 2005, Schwartz was brand director at Sainsbury’s.

Schwartz was appointed head of innovation for Europe and Marketing Director at Coca-Cola in 2000.

Body Shop and Sustainability 
Schwartz was CEO and chairman of The Body Shop from 2013 to 2018.

From 2018 to 2020, Schwartz was interim CEO of Pandora.

As of 2021, he is Chairman for Sustainable Transformation at Kantar.

References 

English businesspeople in retailing
Alumni of the University of Sheffield
Chief executive officers
Living people
Year of birth missing (living people)